Highland Park College was a college located in Des Moines, Iowa.

History
Founded by a local business syndicate, Highland Park opened its doors in 1890. At the time, Highland Park was an emerging northern suburb of the capital city. Enrollment climbed in its early years before a dip following the Panic of 1893; enrollment later stabilized around 2,000 students.

In 1911, the previously independent college was sold to the Presbyterian Church.

In 1918, the college merged with Des Moines College and Central University of Iowa to form a new Des Moines University on the Highland Park campus. That successor institute closed in 1929; today, the campus site has a shopping mall.

References

External links
Historical blog

Defunct private universities and colleges in Iowa
Educational institutions established in 1890
Education in Des Moines, Iowa
1890 establishments in Iowa